Zacharious Carr was an English professional footballer who played as a defender. He played for Preston Hornets before joining Football League side Burnley in April 1890. He could not displace regular left-back Sandy Lang from the starting line-up, and subsequently played his only match for the club on 11 October 1890 in the 1–2 loss to Bolton Wanderers at Turf Moor, and left Burnley shortly afterwards.

References

Year of birth missing
Year of death missing
English footballers
Association football defenders
Burnley F.C. players
English Football League players